"Jump That Rock (Whatever You Want)" is the first single from the repackaged Jumping All Over the World – Whatever You Want, and is the fifth overall single by Scooter from their thirteenth studio album Jumping All Over the World. The song was recorded with British rock group Status Quo, featuring their hit "Whatever You Want".

Track listings
CD Maxi

12"

Download

UK CD Maxi / UK Download

Charts

References

2007 songs
2008 singles
Scooter (band) songs
Jumpstyle songs
Songs written by Rick Parfitt
Songs written by Andy Bown
Songs written by H.P. Baxxter
Songs written by Rick J. Jordan
Songs written by Jens Thele
Songs written by Michael Simon (DJ)